Mr. Tickle is the first book in the Mr. Men series by Roger Hargreaves which was published on 10 August 1971.

The character of the story was originally based on a question by his son Adam Hargreaves, who asked him what a tickle would look like; the claim of which is currently being disputed. Adam Hargreaves said that it was one of his most impossible questions as said in the show 50 Years of Mr. Men.

Mr. Tickle is an orange Mr. Man who has long, bendy arms and a small, blue hat.

Plot
Mr. Tickle's story begins while he is in bed, getting himself a biscuit without getting up, because of his "extraordinarily long arms". He then decides that it is a tickling sort of day, thus he journeys town to tickle people: a teacher, a policeman, a greengrocer, a station guard, a doctor, a butcher, and a postman. The book ends with a warning that Mr. Tickle could be seen at your door, wanting to tickle you.

It is a relatively unusual Mr. Men book where the main character is naughty, tickling everyone, yet there is no corrective action taken to mend his ways—Mr. Tickle is left free to tickle the next day, learning nothing from this.

Translations
Mr. Tickle appears under the titles:

The Mr. Men Show
In the 2008 TV series The Mr. Men Show, Mr. Tickle remains relatively the same in looks, though his hat is aqua with a stripe on it and his arms have a normal size, but can stretch out when needed. However, he tickles other Mr. Men and Little Misses due to the absence of the humans of Dillydale. He is still determined to tickle everyone he interacts with as far as some character traits go, but, instead of doing it for mischief, he does it to make people happy, and will stop when nobody wants him to tickle them—save for when the opportunity knocks with Mr. Grumpy, who is his favourite target. He speaks with a Scottish accent and a Welsh accent. He has a catchphrase: "I think somebody needs a tickle!" In both of the US and UK dubs, he is voiced by Jeff Stewart and Rob Rackstraw, respectively.

Criticism
The Mr. Tickle character has been invoked in discussions over whether tickling children may violate their bodily integrity. Critiquing the unequally applied justice in the realm of Mr. Men, Charlie Brooker decries the fact that Mr. Tickle goes unpunished despite being a "1970s children's entertainer with wandering hands who runs around town touching strangers inappropriately from dawn till dusk", making an apparently tacit referral to Jimmy Savile. Journalist Eleanor Mills compared Mr. Tickle to sex offender Harvey Weinstein in a discussion of misogyny in the Mr. Men books.

See also

 The Mr. Men Show
 List of Mr. Men
 Mr. Tall
 Mr. Men
 Tickle torture

References

Mr. Men series
Tickling
Literary characters introduced in 1971
1971 children's books